Gösta Jansson (8 January 1903 – 20 May 1958) was a Finnish middle-distance runner. He competed in the men's 800 metres at the 1924 Summer Olympics.

References

External links
 

1903 births
1958 deaths
Athletes (track and field) at the 1924 Summer Olympics
Finnish male middle-distance runners
Olympic athletes of Finland